Uraspis is a genus of jacks.

Species
The currently recognized species in this genus are:

References

 
Caranginae
Marine fish genera
Taxa named by Pieter Bleeker